This is the British First Army order of battle on 20 April 1943 during the Tunisia Campaign of World War II.
 British First ArmyCommanded by: Lieutenant-General Kenneth Anderson
 V CorpsCommanded by Lieutenant-General Charles Allfrey
 British 25th Tank Brigade (less 51st (Leeds Rifles) Royal Tank Regiment)
 British 1st Infantry Division (Major-General Walter Clutterbuck)
 British 4th Infantry Division (Major-General John Hawkesworth)
 British 78th Infantry Division (Major-General Vyvyan Evelegh)
 British IX CorpsCommanded by: Lieutenant-General John Crocker
 51st (Leeds Rifles) Royal Tank Regiment
 British 1st Armoured Division (Major-General Raymond Briggs)
 British 6th Armoured Division (Major-General Charles Keightley)
 British 46th Infantry Division (Major-General Harold Freeman-Attwood)
 French XIX CorpsCommanded by: Lieutenant General Louis Koeltz
 Brigade Légère Mécanique (Tank Group)
 1st King's Dragoon Guards
  (Major General )
 Division du Maroc (Lieutenant General )
  (Major-General )
 U.S. II Corps (co-ordinated by First Army but under direct control of 18th Army Group)Commanded by: Major General Omar Bradley
 Corps Francs d'Afrique (three battalions)
 4th and 6th Tabors of Moroccan goumiers
 U.S. 1st Armored Division (less one regiment) (Major General Ernest N. Harmon)
 U.S. 1st Infantry Division (Major General Terry de la M. Allen)
 U.S. 9th Infantry Division (Major General Manton S. Eddy)
 U.S. 34th Infantry Division (Major General Charles W. Ryder)

See also

 List of orders of battle
 British First Army order of battle, 4 May 1943

References
 Anderson, Lt.-General Kenneth (1946). Official despatch by Kenneth Anderson, GOC-in-C First Army covering events in NW Africa, 8 November 1942–13 May 1943 published in

Footnotes

World War II orders of battle